Jane Scali (born 8 August 1959) is an Australian singer and former TV personality. She was one of the original cast members of the long-running TV show Young Talent Time from 1971 to 1976.

Early life 
Scali was a cast member in the junior variety show Brian And The Juniors, produced at HSV-7 in the late 1960s. 

In 1971, at the age of 11, Scali joined the cast of a new TV show, Young Talent Time. It was scheduled to run for a 13-week season, but it became very successful and Scali was part of the show for five years.

Career 
Scali was a regular performer on a number of Australian TV shows, such as the Rolf Harris Show, The Saturday Show and later appeared on shows such as Good Morning Australia, Midday, the Royal Children's Hospital Good Friday Appeal and In Melbourne Tonight.

Scali performed in musical theatre for the first time when she was 17, as the lead role in the Melbourne Theatre Company's production of Cinderella. Other musical theatre roles in her career have included Gretchen in The Student Prince, Sandy in Grease and Lily St Regis in Annie. In 1995, she co-produced a musical comedy production entitled Fractured Fairytales, which was nominated for a Mo Award.

Scali has performed the Australian national anthem at a number of sporting events, such as the Bledisloe Cup, as well as the opening ceremonies of stadiums.

Awards

Mo Awards
The Australian Entertainment Mo Awards (commonly known informally as the Mo Awards), were annual Australian entertainment industry awards. They recognised achievements in live entertainment in Australia from 1975 to 2016. Jane Scali won seven awards in that time.
 (wins only)
|-
| 1987
| Jane Scali
| Daily Telegraph Reader Award 
| 
|-
| 1990
| Jane Scali
| Female Vocal Cabaret Performer of the Year
| 
|-
| 1991
| Jane Scali
| Female Vocal Variety Performer of the Year
| 
|-
| 1992
| Jane Scali
| Female Vocal Variety Performer of the Year
| 
|-
| 1996
| Jane Scali
| Female Vocal Variety Performer of the Year
| 
|-
| 1997
| Jane Scali
| Female Vocal Variety Performer of the Year
| 
|-
| 1998
| Jane Scali
| Female Vocal Variety Performer of the Year
| 
|-

References 

Living people
1959 births
Australian television personalities
Women television personalities
Australian child singers
Place of birth missing (living people)
20th-century Australian women singers
21st-century Australian women singers